Gretna Green is a 1915 American silent romantic comedy film directed by Thomas N. Heffron and distributed through Paramount Pictures. It is based on the Broadway play by Grace Livingston Furniss and stars Marguerite Clark. The film is now presumed lost.

The film and the play are based on the fame of the Scottish town Gretna Green. The town has become a popular destination for couples who want to legally marry as people under the age of 16 can do so without their parents' consent (under Scottish law).

Cast
 Marguerite Clark as Dolly Erskine
 Arthur Hoops as Sir William Chetwynde
 Helen Lutrell as Lady Chetwynde
 Lyster Chambers as Lord Trevor
 Wilmuth Merkyl as Earl of Basset
 George Stilwell as Captain Cardiff
 J. Albert Hall as Colonel Hooker
 Martin Reagan as Innkeeper
 Julia Walcott as Innkeeper's Wife

References

External links

 
 

1915 films
1910s romantic comedy films
American romantic comedy films
American silent feature films
American black-and-white films
American films based on plays
Lost American films
Paramount Pictures films
Films directed by Thomas N. Heffron
1915 comedy films
1910s American films
Silent romantic comedy films
Silent American comedy films